CMHC is an abbreviation for different entities:
 Canada Mortgage and Housing Corporation, a Canadian government agency providing homebuyer assistance and insurance to lenders in case of defaults
 Central Minnesota Heart Center
 Clark Material Handling Company, a manufacturer of forklift trucks in Lexington, Kentucky, USA
 Connacht Minor Hurling Championship, a hurling competition in Ireland

It is also an abbreviation for Clinical Mental Health Counselor.